This is a list of years in Vatican City. For only articles about years in Vatican City that have been written, see :Category:Years in Vatican City.

20th century 
1920s: 1929

21st century

See also 

 
Vatican City